Earthquake in Chile may refer to:

 The Earthquake in Chile, an 1807 novella by Heinrich von Kleist
 Earthquake in Chile (film), a 1975 West German television drama film, an adaptation of the novella

See also
 List of earthquakes in Chile